Victory Park may refer to:

Parks

 Victory Park, Yerevan, Armenia
 Victory Park (Chorley), England
 Victory Park (Riga), Latvia
 Victory Park, on Poklonnaya Hill in Moscow, Russia
 Victory Park (Tolyatti), Russia
 Victory Park, Dushanbe, Tajikistan
 Victory Park, Dallas, Texas, U.S.
 Victory Park, Pasadena, California, U.S.
 Victory Park, home of the Haggin Museum in Stockton, California, U.S.
 Victory Park (New Rochelle), New York, U.S.

Metro stations
 Park Pobedy (Moscow Metro) (Victory Park)
 Park Pobedy (Saint Petersburg Metro) (Victory Park)

See also
 Moskovsky Victory Park, Saint Petersburg, Russia
 Maritime Victory Park, Saint Petersburg, Russia
 One Victory Park, a skyscraper in Dallas, Texas
 Park Pobedy (disambiguation)
 SS Park Victory, a 1945 cargo ship